Nilufar Yasmin (born 1 July 1975) is a Bangladeshi athlete. She competed in the women's long jump at the 1996 Summer Olympics.

References

External links
 

1975 births
Living people
Athletes (track and field) at the 1996 Summer Olympics
Bangladeshi female long jumpers
Olympic athletes of Bangladesh
Place of birth missing (living people)